TV Ilegal, stylized as tv [i]lεgal, was a Puerto Rican comedy and parody/satire television show broadcast on WAPA-TV from 2006 to 2009. The show parodied both local and international shows and people such as local shows, telenovelas, variety shows and others. Most of the cast had previously worked on Sálvese Quien Pueda on Telemundo.

The show's cast featured comedians Herbert Cruz, Ivonne Arriaga, Noris Joffre, Lizmarie Quintana, Abraham Martí, Ángel Figueroa, Edgardo "El Bebo" Adames and Carlos Ramírez. In 2007, Abraham Martí left the show to pursue music and acting opportunities in Spain and abroad. On May 13, 2009, the show broadcast its last episode due to no advertisement revenue to pay the actors. After a week of cancellation, a few of the cast members moved the show's format to Cadena Salsoul in Radio Ilegal.

TV Ilegal aired two specials broadcast in Telemundo in November 2011 and early 2012, before returning to television to Univision Puerto Rico on October 1, 2012 on Noche Ilegal. Herbert Cruz, Lizmarie Quintana, Ivonne Arriaga, Abraham Martí and Ángel Figueroa returned as part of the cast, except for Noris Joffre, Carlos Ramirez and Edgardo "El Bebo" Adames. The show ended in 2015.

TV show parodies

Parodies of famous people
A list of famous people (Puerto Rican, or International). These are the people that get their own skit, rather than appear "inside" main show parodies.

Special guests
Special guests included local personalities, politicians, musical guests, among others.

 Luis Raúl - Confronted his counterpart in a competition to determine the real Luis Raúl.
 Víctor Alicea
 Milly Cangiano
 Aníbal Acevedo Vilá - Governor of Puerto Rico, 2005–2009
 Luis Fortuño - Governor of Puerto Rico, 2009–2013
 Jowell & Randy - Got called "Blower & Panty" by Maripilly.
 José Nogueras - Musical guest
 Rubén Sánchez - Special guest on the parody to one of his former shows
 Miguelito featuring Divino - Musical guests
 Miguel Cotto - Boxer and former OMB Welter Champion

Writers
 Javier del Valle
 Agustín Rosario (Executive producer and artistic director)
 Edmee Rivera (General producer)
 Pedro Juan Ríos
 Carlos Ramírez

Cancellation
Facing insufficient advertisement revenue during their time slot to pay the cast, the show was ultimately cancelled in May 2009, with its final broadcast on May 13, 2009.

Aftermath

Radio spin-off
On May 21, 2009, producer Agustín Rosario took TV Ilegal to radio on Cadena Salsoul with a weekly radio show called Radio Ilegal, only a week from its television departure. Rosario hosted the radio show with actors Herbert Cruz, Noris Joffre, Lizmarie Quintana, and other talents that parody television and political people. The radio show kept the parody concept of local politicians and celebrities, with the "benefit that people can imagine them [the characters], because they have already seen it on television", according to Uno Radio Group Chain President, Luis "Tuto" Soto.

Television specials
In November 2011, TV Ilegal returned to television with a special broadcast in Telemundo; Noris Joffre, who worked in WAPA at the time, did not appear. A second television special was aired in 2012 on Telemundo, introducing new parodies such as Dando Manigueta (Dando Candela), the Gricel Mamery/Javier Ceriani exposure incident, José Ortiz "El Buen Samaritano", a clairvoyant claiming he spoke to the spirit of murdered child Lorenzo González Cacho; the Manny Manuel car accident and Dinga & Matraca (Minga & Petraca).

Return to TV
After more than three years, TV Ilegal returned to television to Univision Puerto Rico on October 1, 2012 as Noche Ilegal (stylized as NOCHE [i]LEGAL). Herbert Cruz, Lizmarie Quintana, Ivonne Arriaga and Ángel Figueroa reprised each of their parodies and introduced new ones as well; Abraham Martí was briefly part of the cast but left afterwards. Noris Joffre and Edgardo "El Bebo" Adames were the only two cast members from the original show to not return. Episodes ran for 30 minutes, including commercials, airing weekly nights, and were initially hosted by various local celebrities, politicians or artists, later permanently hosted by Gricel Mamery. Noche Illegal was the final show left in Univision Puerto Rico's local programming block after the network discontinued most of its local workshops including the morning, noon and afternoon newscast. The show was ultimately cancelled in 2015.

References

Puerto Rican television series
2000s Puerto Rican television series